Terence Keel is an American author, professor, and public speaker. He is an associate professor at University of California, Los Angeles appointed in the Institute for Society and Genetics and the Department of African American Studies.

Early life

Terence Keel was born in Sacramento, California. He attended Laguna Creek high school in Elk Grove, CA and was raised in a Black Pentecostal church in south Sacramento.

Career

Keel earned a Bachelor of Arts in theology from Xavier University of Louisiana. At Xavier he became a student in the department of Theology which introduced him to liberation theology and the works of James Cone, Albert J. Raboteau, and Charles H. Long. He then attended Harvard Divinity School, earning a Masters of Theological Studies in 2005. In 2012 Keel received a PhD from the Committee on the Study of Religion at Harvard Graduate School of Arts and Sciences where he worked with Janet Browne, Amy Hollywood, Evelyn Higginbotham, and Noah Feldman. As a doctoral student Keel earned awards from the National Science Foundation, the Social Science Research Council, and the Charles Warren Center for American Studies.

In 2012 Keel joined the faculty at UC Santa Barbara where he was appointed in the Department of Black Studies and the Department of History. Keel would eventually become Vice Chair in the Department of History. In 2018 Keel became the first Black Studies professor to earn the Harold J. Plous Award, the highest honor given to a junior faculty at UC Santa Barbara in recognition for extraordinary scholarship, teaching, and campus service. During that same year Keel published Divine Variations: How Christian Thought Became Racial Science with Standard University Press. Keel argues that the persistence of race in the fields of anthropology, medicine, and biology is the result of enduring beliefs and value commitments that stem from the religious, intellectual, and political history of Europe and America. Divine Variations won the 2021 Iris Book Award and was the winner of the 2018 Choice Award for Outstanding Academic Title, sponsored by the American Library Association.

Keel left UC Santa Barbara in 2018 to join UCLA, where he was appointed to the Department of African American Studies and the UCLA Institute for Society & Genetics. He regularly teaches courses on the history of scientific racism, contemporary issues in public health, the interplay of science and religion, and posthumanism. During the 2020–2021 academic year, Keel was the associate director of the Ralph J. Bunche Center for African American Studies and also associate director of Critical Theory in the Center for the Study of Racism, Social Justice and Health in the UCLA Fielding School of Public Health. Keel currently serves as the Advisor for Structural Competency and Innovation for the Standardized Patient Program in the David Geffen School of Medicine at UCLA.

During the Spring of 2020 Keel founded the BioCritical Studies Lab (BCS) to investigate how humans and non-humans embody legal, political, and economic conditions that sustain and shorten life. With his BCS lab, Keel is involved in a collaboration with the Los Angeles-based social justice organization  Dignity and Power Now, Dr. Nicholas Shapiro of the Carceral Ecologies Lab, Dr. Lauren Brown of the Linked Fate Data Collective, and Professor Aziza Ahmed of the University of California Irvine School of Law. In this collaboration Keel is studying law enforcement related death in the United States and the practices of the medical examiner-coroner system.

Awards

Harold J. Plous Award (2017)
2021 Iris Book Award
Luskin Center for History and Policy Award.
Robert Wood Johnson Interdisciplinary Research Award 2021-2023
National Institute of Health, National Library of Medicine Research Award 2022-2025

Books
Divine Variations: How Christian Thought Became Racial Science (Stanford, CA: Stanford University Press, 2018).
Critical Approaches to Science and Religion ed. Myrna Perez, Terence Keel, and Ahmed Ragab, (New York, NY: Columbia University Press, 2022)

References 

Living people
University of California, Los Angeles faculty
University of California, Santa Barbara faculty
Xavier University of Louisiana alumni
Harvard Divinity School alumni
Harvard Graduate School of Arts and Sciences alumni
Year of birth missing (living people)